Brives may refer to:

 Brives, Indre, Indre departement, France
 Brives-Charensac, Haute-Loire departement, France

See also
 Brive, name of Brive-la-Gaillarde until 1919, Corrèze departement, France